Carol Jean White (1946October 1, 2000) was an American philosopher who was an associate professor in the Santa Clara University philosophy department. She was known for her works on Heidegger's philosophy.

Books
 Time and Death: Heidegger's Analysis of Finitude, Edited by Mark Ralkowski, Foreword by Hubert L. Dreyfus, Ashgate 2005 (Routledge 2016)
 Faith in theory and practice: essays on justifying religious belief, Open Court 1993, edited with Elizabeth S. Radcliffe

References

External links
 Carol White

20th-century American philosophers
Phenomenologists
Continental philosophers
Philosophy academics
Heidegger scholars
1946 births
2000 deaths
Kierkegaard scholars